Zabrat Airport  is a public use airport located 6 nm northeast of Baku, Bakı, Azerbaijan.

See also
List of airports in Azerbaijan

References

External links 
 Airport record for Zabrat Airport at Landings.com

Airports in Azerbaijan
Transport in Baku
Buildings and structures in Baku